Dads is an American sitcom that aired on ABC from December 5, 1986 until February 6, 1987.

Premise
Two single widowed fathers live together in a house in Philadelphia.

Cast
Barry Bostwick as Rick Armstrong
Carl Weintraub as Louie Mangotti
Skye Bassett as Kelly Armstrong
Eddie Castrodad as Allan Mangiotti
Jason Naylor as Kenny Mangiotti

Episodes

References

External links
IMDb
TV.com
TV Guide

1986 American television series debuts
1987 American television series endings
1980s American sitcoms
English-language television shows
American Broadcasting Company original programming
Television shows set in Philadelphia
Television series by Sony Pictures Television